The 1910 NSWRFL season was the third season of the New South Wales Rugby Football League premiership, Sydney’s top-level rugby league club competition, Australia’s first. Eight teams from across the city contested during the season for the premiership and the Royal Agricultural Society Challenge Shield. During the season, many of the league’s top players took part in matches of the 1910 Great Britain Lions tour of Australia.

Season summary
On 23 July 1910 at the Sydney Showground the South Sydney club defeated Western Suburbs 67–0. This still stands as Souths’ highest ever score and biggest winning margin in a premiership game. It was not beaten in the NSWRFL until 11 May 1935 when St. George defeated Canterbury-Bankstown 91–6, which remains the record score and margin as of 2022.

During the season Annandale’s Ray, Roy, Rex and Bernard Norman became the first set of four brothers to play in the same NSWRFL side.

The League's takings for all matches this year amounted to £13,512, an increase of over £6,000 on the previous season. 1910 was the first season where the NSFWRFL had more people in attendance than Rugby Union.

Teams
With the loss of Cumberland at the end of the 1908 season, the league remained with eight teams; a preferable outcome since no byes would be needed. However by the end of the 1909 season, interest for a local Newcastle competition as well as the difficulties of longer travel for the Newcastle side saw it pull out of the premiership. As a result, a team from Annandale joined the premiership to leave the competition with eight teams. Also this season St. Luke's Park became the Western Suburbs club's home ground.

Ladder
Newtown finished on top of the League's ladder at the end of the regular season.

Final

Unlike the previous two seasons where a play-off system was used to decide the premier, there was only one game played in 1910. The top two teams, Newtown and South Sydney, played off in a memorable match in front of fifteen or sixteen thousand people at the Sydney Showground on 17 September 1910. Leading 4-2 with reportedly only seconds to go, South Sydney seemed set to take out their third straight premiership. However, after Souths player Howard Hallett was forced to kick the ball clear from his own line, Newtown centre Albert Hawkes caught the ball on the full just metres away from halfway and the touch line. The rules at the time allowed Hawkes to claim a "fair mark" and Newtown to have a shot at goal. Newtown captain Charles "Boxer" Russell was successful in kicking the goal from a difficult position, allowing Newtown to tie the game and win the competition as they had been minor premiers.

Newtown  4 (Goals: Charles Russell 2)

drew with
 
South Sydney Rabbitohs 4 (Goals: Jim Davis 2)

References

External links
  
  
 Premiership History and Statistics RL1908 (archived)
 1910 - Stunning Goal Gives Newtown The Title RL1908 (archived)
 Annandale RLFC RL1908 (archived)
 Newcastle RLFC (1908/1909) RL1908 (archived)
Results: 1908-1910 at rabbitohs.com.au

New South Wales Rugby League premiership
NSWRFL season